Jennifer Corbet (born May 27, 1965) is an American rower. She competed in the women's coxed four event at the 1988 Summer Olympics.

References

External links
 

1965 births
Living people
American female rowers
Olympic rowers of the United States
Rowers at the 1988 Summer Olympics
People from Jackson Hole, Wyoming
21st-century American women